Eidsvåg may refer to:

People
 Bjørn Eidsvåg, a Norwegian singer, songwriter and priest

Places
 Eidsvåg, Nesset, a village in Molde municipality in Møre og Romsdal county, Norway
 Eidsvåg, Bergen, a neighbourhood in the city of Bergen in Vestland county, Norway

Other
 Eidsvåg IL (Hordaland), a football club in Bergen, Norway
 , a Norwegian coaster